Sir Philip Henry Macarthur Goldfinch KBE (13 April 1884 – 7 April 1943) was an Australian businessman and politician.

He was born at Gosport, Hampshire, England, to Henry Edward Goldfinch, a lieutenant in the Royal Navy, and Elizabeth Maria, née King. He arrived in New South Wales in 1886 and was educated at Sydney Grammar School before working for the Colonial Sugar Refining Company (CSRC) in 1902 as a chemist. On 7 March 1911 he married Mary Cowper, with whom he had three children. He became general manager of CSRC in 1928 and served until 1943; he was also chairman of the British Settlers' Welfare Committee from 1931 and was created a Knight Commander of the Order of the British Empire in 1934. In 1935 he won a by-election for the New South Wales Legislative Assembly seat of Gordon, representing the United Australia Party, but he resigned in 1937, before the expiration of his term, citing business commitments. Goldfinch died at Roseville in 1943.

References

 

1884 births
1943 deaths
United Australia Party members of the Parliament of New South Wales
Members of the New South Wales Legislative Assembly
Australian Knights Commander of the Order of the British Empire
Australian politicians awarded knighthoods
British emigrants to Australia
Politicians from Sydney
20th-century Australian politicians
People educated at Sydney Grammar School
Australian chief executives
Australian anti-communists
Businesspeople from Sydney